FC Solyaris Moscow was a Russian football team based in Moscow. It was founded in 2014. In 2014–15 season, it started its professional history in the third-tier Russian Professional Football League. After the 2016–17 season, it was dissolved due to lack of financing.

References

External links
  Official site

Association football clubs established in 2014
Association football clubs disestablished in 2017
Defunct football clubs in Moscow
2014 establishments in Russia
2017 establishments in Russia